The Pori Brigade, based in Huovinrinne, Säkylä and Niinisalo, Kankaanpää is a Finnish Army unit, directly under the Army headquarters. It comprises six battalion-level units and also trains soldiers for the Finnish Rapid Deployment Force.

History
Pori Brigade traditions date back to the 17th century. On 16 February 1626, King Gustav II Adolf of Sweden founded the Royal Pori Regiment during the Thirty Years' War. The regiment served in most wars of the great power era of Sweden, and was destroyed and reformed several times during the Great Northern War.

The regiment fought first as a part of the 1st Brigade and later as a part of the 2nd Brigade during the Finnish War and was effectively destroyed during the winter 1809 as a result of casualties, disease and hunger. The remainder of the unit was disbanded when the Swedish army of Finland surrendered at Kalix River However, in 1855, when the conscription based on Swedish-era allotment system was reintroduced, also the allotments of Pori Regiment founded a conscripted sharpshooter battalion which was disbanded with other allotment system battalions in 1868. The introduction of conscription in 1878 lead to the founding of the 2nd Finnish Sharpshooter Battalion, which is included in the lineage of the brigade. The battalion, which never saw combat, was disbanded in 1901 as a part of the russification measures of the Russian Imperial Government.

During the Finnish Civil War in 1918, Pori Regiment fought on the South-western front and was garrisoned in Turku after the war.

Its men took successfully part in the Winter War and the Continuation War while serving in a number of regiments. The Infantry Regiment 6 became the peace-time unit garrisoned in Turku after the general demobilisation following the Continuation War. As the Finnish Army units were given provincial names in 1957, the unit received its present name, Pori Brigade.

As the city of Turku grew, the garrison became an impractical location for an infantry-training unit. Thus, the Brigade was moved to a new garrison in Säkylä, with 4,000 hectares of land for exercise and firing range purposes.

The brigade was greatly enlarged by the merger of Artillery Brigade into Pori Brigade in 2015. Now, the unit has two main exercise areas: Huovinrinne at Säkylä and Pohjankangas-Hämeenkangas (10,500 ha of live-fire area, 5,000 ha of exercise area) in Niinisalo.

Organization
This chapter is based on and its subpages which contain the official public description of the Brigade's organisation. The Brigade operates in the Huovinrinne garrison in Säkylä and Niinisalo garrison in Kankaanpää
 Brigade Headquarters in Säkylä, with two regional offices responsible for conscription and local defence
 South-Western Finland regional office in Turku, responsible for Satakunta and Finland Proper
 Ostrobothnia regional office in Vaasa, responsible for regions of Ostrobothnia, Southern Ostrobothnia and Central Ostrobothnia
 Satakunta Jäger Battalion (SatJP) in Säkylä
 1st Jaeger Company
 2nd Jaeger Company
 Antitank Company
 Military Police Company
 Satakunta Engineer and Signals Battalion in Säkylä
 Signals Company
 HQ Company
 1st Engineer Company
 NBC Company
 Satakunta Artillery Regiment at Niinisalo, formerly part of Artillery Brigade
 1st Artillery Battery
 2nd Artillery Battery
 Multiple Rocket Launcher System Battery
 Mortar Company
 Ostrobothnia Jaeger Battalion at Niinisalo
 3rd Jaeger Company
 Reconnaissance Company
 UAV Reconnaissance Battery
 Detachment for Reconnaissance, Surveillance and Targeting Support
 Finland Proper Logistics Battalion
 Headquarters
 1st Logistics Company at Säkylä
 2nd Logistics Company at Niinisalo
 Niinisalo Small Animals Clinic
 Other logistics establishments
 Crisis Management Center
 Training Company

The Satakunta Jäger Battalion trains Jäger, or mechanized infantry companies, primarily equipped with Pasi (XA-185, -202 and -203 variants) and AMV armored personnel carriers. It also trains anti-tank troops and company-level specialists, like combat medics.

Satakunta Engineer and Signals Battalion consists of four companies. The 1st Engineer Company produces wartime engineer troops, some of which are assigned to water-crossing units. Mechanics are trained during the summer season to maintain and repair outboard motors. Some of the engineers are trained to operate landing craft or to handle pontoon and crossing equipment. Engineers construct and dismantle mobile bridges, build bridges and other structures and perform blasting and ground-breaking operations. NBC Company has the national responsibility of training CBRN protection troops for the Finnish Army, Navy and Air Force, giving supplementary training for career personnel and conducting R&D. The HQ and Signals companies train signals and headquarters troops and military police troops.

Satakunta Artillery Regiment in Niinisalo trains artillery troops, with training for all artillery duties, including weather and geodetic services. The training equipment includes the artillery pieces, mortars and MLRS systems in Finnish service, of which the 155K98 cannon, AMOS mortar system and MRLS.

Ostrobothnia Jaeger Battalion in Niinisalo trains infantry companies, reconnaissance troops, artillery forwards observers and military working dog handlers.

The Finland Proper Logistics Battalion includes the logistics establishments in Säkylä and Niinisalo. The conscript units train logistics units and military drivers for crisis time needs. The Niinisalo small animals clinic has the national responsibility for the veterinary service of Finnish Defence Forces service dogs.

The Crisis Management Centre is responsible for training and deploying all Finnish Army units in international duties. When a new operation is established, the Centre founds the Finnish contingent and trains it for the operation. For existing operations, the Centre trains the new personnel rotations and takes care of the domestic human resources management. When the Finnish Army has a standing active EU Battlegroup contingent, the Centre is responsible for it.

Pori Brigade regularly attracts foreign officials and officers for demonstrations, and has a long history of joint training with NATO and other forces.

References

External links
 Official site
 Porin Prikaatin kilta ry, the voluntary association of the brigade's reservists and career personnel

Brigades of Finland
Säkylä